La Cruz is a village in the Florida Department of Uruguay.

Geography

History
On 23 November 1929, the status of the group of houses here was elevated to "Pueblo" (village) by the Act of Ley Nº 8.497.

Population
In 2011 La Cruz had a population of 747.
 
Source: Instituto Nacional de Estadística de Uruguay

Places of worship
 Exaltation of the Cross Chapel (Roman Catholic)

References

External links

INE map of La Cruz

Populated places in the Florida Department